EBP US, formerly known as Economic Development Research Group, is an American company that provides economic analysis and research to support planning and policy in the transportation, economic development, and sustainable energy sectors. Based in Boston, and with several satellite offices in the US, the firm is part of the EBP family of companies, with full-service offices in Switzerland, Germany, China, Brazil, and Chile. 

EBP US's service capabilities include economic impact analysis, benefit-cost analysis, finance analysis, program evaluation, guidebooks and guidance tools, scenario planning, and data analytics.  The firm also develops interactive web tools and custom database tools for measurement of economic patterns, trends, impacts and benefits of programs, projects and policies.

References

External links
 Official website
 TREDIS website

Economic research institutes
Management consulting firms of the United States
Urban, rural, and regional economics
Software companies based in Massachusetts
Software companies of the United States
1997 establishments in the United States
1997 establishments in Massachusetts
Software companies established in 1997
Companies established in 1997